Xiangtan High-Tech Industrial Development Zone (abbr: XTHTZ) is a national high-tech industrial zone in Xiangtan, Hunan, China.

History
Xiangtan High-Tech Industrial Development Zone was first established in 1992. It was upgraded to a national HTZs approved by the State Council of China on March 18, 2009. On October 31, 2014, Xiangtan High-Tech Industrial Development Zone signed an industry university research cooperation agreement with Hunan University.

References

External links
 

Economy of Xiangtan
1992 establishments in China
Special Economic Zones of China